James L. McPherson (March 29, 1881 – January 3, 1951) was a Canadian politician and physician from Alberta.

Early life

James L. McPherson was born on March 29, 1881, at Leaswater, Ontario to William McPherson and Katherine Orr, both of Scottish descent. He was educated at Owen Sound, Hamilton and Toronto. McPherson married the daughter of J. H. Thorsley on August 9, 1911.

Political life

He was a member of the Legislative Assembly of Alberta from 1935 to 1948, representing the Alberta Social Credit Party.  He served on the Social Credit Board following the 1937 Social Credit backbenchers' revolt. He died in Ryley, Alberta in 1951.

References

1881 births
1951 deaths
Alberta Social Credit Party MLAs
Physicians from Alberta